Devan Deangelo Downey (born September 28, 1987) is an American professional basketball player.

Amateur career
He was born in Chester, South Carolina where he attended Chester High School. Named S.C. Class AAA Player of the Year and Mr. Basketball as a senior at Chester High Devan Downey Averaged 36.9 points, 6.1 assists, 4.3 rebounds and 4.7 steals his senior year under coach De'Andre Scott.

He played collegiately for the University of Cincinnati and then the University of South Carolina, where he was an honorable mention All-American and 1st team All-SEC player in 2008–09. Downey went undrafted in the 2010 NBA Draft.

Perhaps the most notable game of his career occurred on January 26, 2010, when he scored 30 points in a victory over a previously undefeated University of Kentucky team which aired nationally on ESPN. The game was the first loss for John Wall, DeMarcus Cousins, and John Calipari while at the University of Kentucky. The game and particularly the performance by Downey is revisited by hosts Gary Parrish and Matt Norlander of CBS Sports three times a week on their podcast, Eye on College Basketball.

Professional career
In July 2010 he signed with Antalya BSB in Turkey. In January 2011 he signed with KK Zadar in Croatia, but because of the financial problems of the club left the team in March 2011 and then signed with Chorale Roanne in France. In March 2013, he signed with BC Timișoara in Romania. He later went on to play for the Dominican Republic and eventually snagged a two-year contract with Venezuela. In 2019 the pandemic impacted sports all over the world. Devan has been unsigned since 2019 and is currently unemployed.

See also
List of NCAA Division I men's basketball career steals leaders

References

External links
Turkish League stats
Player Bio on ESPN
Eurobasket.com profile 
RealGM.com profile

1987 births
Living people
American expatriate basketball people in Belgium
American expatriate basketball people in Croatia
American expatriate basketball people in the Dominican Republic
American expatriate basketball people in France
American expatriate basketball people in Kosovo
American expatriate basketball people in Qatar
American expatriate basketball people in Romania
American expatriate basketball people in Turkey
American expatriate basketball people in Venezuela
Antalya Büyükşehir Belediyesi players
Basketball players from South Carolina
Chorale Roanne Basket players
Cincinnati Bearcats men's basketball players
Fort Wayne Mad Ants players
Guaiqueríes de Margarita players
KB Prishtina players
KK Zadar players
People from Chester, South Carolina
Point guards
South Carolina Gamecocks men's basketball players
TED Ankara Kolejliler players
RBC Pepinster players
Al-Gharafa SC basketball players
American men's basketball players